

The Besson H-5 (or sometimes Besson MB-11) was a French transport quadruplane flying boat designed by the Marcel Besson company of Boulogne. The only H-5 was damaged and development was abandoned.

Development
The HB.5 (MB-10) originally started development as an open-sea reconnaissance/bombing flying-boat, but it was completed as a 20-seat passenger transport flying-boat. Described as grotesque it had two sets of staggered biplane wings with an unusual X-type bracing and a biplane tail with triple fins and rudders. Powered by four Salmson 9Z radial engines that were located in tandem pairs in line with the third mainplane.  The H-5 had a conventional fuselage on a three-ply mahogany boat hull, which had 24 watertight compartments.

The H-5 was tested from the St Raphael naval air station in 1922 and proved to be stable with little vibration. After a few test flights the H-5 was accidentally damaged and development was abandoned.

Specifications

See also

References

Flying boats
1920s French civil utility aircraft
Quadruplanes
Four-engined push-pull aircraft
H-5
Aircraft first flown in 1922